Balsam Karam (born 29 July 1983) is a Swedish writer and librarian of Iranian Kurdish descent.

Career  
She works at Rinkeby Library in Stockholm and is a member of the Swedish Writers’ Union's library council.

In 2018, she released her first book, Händelsehorisonten (Event Horizon). She was awarded the Smålits migrantpris in 2021 for the book.

In 2021, she released her second book, Singulariteten (The Singularity). The book was shortlisted for the 2021 European Union Prize for Literature.

Personal life 
Born in Teheran, in Iran, in 1983, her family moved to Sweden when she was seven. She studied at Biskops Arnös författarskola before doing a master's degree at the University of Gothenburg.

References 

1983 births
Living people
Swedish people of Iranian descent
Swedish people of Kurdish descent
Swedish librarians
Women librarians
21st-century Swedish women writers
Women science fiction and fantasy writers
University of Gothenburg alumni